Adios is the sixteenth studio album by German rock band Böhse Onkelz. It was released in 2004.

In 2005, the album was ranked number 393 in Rock Hard magazine's book of "The 500 Greatest Rock & Metal Albums of All Time".

Track listing

Track notes

Superstar

A song criticizing the pop music talent shows in television like Popstars or Deutschland sucht den Superstar (the German version of American Idol).

Ja, Ja

Refers to an idiom, which means "Kiss my ass".

Kinder dieser Zeit

Whether hip hop, metal or other fans - all should stand united.

Hass-tler

The title is a wordplay from Hass (Hate) and Hitler. "You are the Hass-tler: Paranoid and confused / You are the Hass-tler: One time pierced through brain"

Onkelz vs. Jesus

A song about their wrong confidence being more famous than Jesus.

Singles

Track listing 
Onkelz vs. Jesus
Superstar
My Generation (The Who cover)
Prinz Valium (instrumental)

Charts

Weekly charts

Year-end charts

References

Böhse Onkelz albums
2004 albums
German-language albums